Dragotin is a village in Croatia.

References

Populated places in Osijek-Baranja County